The Văsălat is a left tributary of the Râul Doamnei in Romania. Its source is in the Iezer Mountains.

References

Rivers of Romania
Rivers of Argeș County